The Bauxite of Cornet is a geological formation in Romania whose strata date back to the Early Cretaceous. Dinosaur remains are among the fossils that have been recovered from the formation. It exists as karstic sediments infilling fissures and caves in limestone.

The formation was discovered in a former bauxite mine near Cornet and Oradea during a mine explosion in 1978 but the mine flooded in 1999 so further excavations of the formation are currently impossible.

Vertebrate paleofauna

Pterosaurs

Dinosaurs

See also

 List of dinosaur-bearing rock formations

Footnotes

References
 Weishampel, David B.; Dodson, Peter; and Osmólska, Halszka (eds.): The Dinosauria, 2nd, Berkeley: University of California Press. 861 pp. .

Lower Cretaceous Series of Europe
Berriasian Stage